The GeForce 200 series is a series of Tesla-based GeForce graphics processing units developed by Nvidia.

Architecture

The GeForce 200 Series introduced Nvidia's second generation of Tesla (microarchitecture), Nvidia's unified shader architecture; the first major update to it since introduced with the GeForce 8 Series.

The GeForce GTX 280 and GTX 260 are based on the same processor core. During the manufacturing process, GTX chips were binned and separated through defect testing of the core's logic functionality. Those that fail to meet the GTX 280 hardware specification are re-tested and binned as GTX 260 (which is specified with fewer stream processors, less ROPs and a narrower memory bus).

In late 2008, Nvidia re-released the GTX 260 with 216 stream processors, up from 192. Effectively, there were two GTX 260 cards in production with non-trivial performance differences.

The GeForce 200 series GPUs (GT200a/b GPU), excluding GeForce GTS 250, GTS 240 GPUs (these are older G92b GPUs), have double precision support for use in GPGPU applications. GT200 GPUs also have improved performance in geometry shading.

, the GT200 is the seventh largest commercial GPU ever constructed, consisting of 1.4 billion transistors covering a 576 mm2 die surface area built on a 65 nm process. It is the fifth largest CMOS-logic chip that has been fabricated at the TSMC foundry.  The GeForce 400 Series have since superseded the GT200 chips in transistor count, but the original GT200 dies still exceed the GF100 die size. It is larger than even the Kepler-based GK210 GPU used in the Tesla K80, which has 7.1 billion transistors on a 561 mm2 die manufactured in 28 nm. The Ampere GA100 is currently the largest commercial GPU ever fabricated at 826 mm2 with 54.2 billion transistors.

Nvidia officially announced and released the retail version of the previously OEM only GeForce 210 (GT218 GPU) and GeForce GT 220 (GT216 GPU) on October 12, 2009. Nvidia officially announced and released the GeForce GT 240 (GT215 GPU) on November 17, 2009. The new 40nm GPUs feature the new PureVideo HD VP4 decoder hardware in them, as the older GeForce 8 and 9 GPUs only have PureVideo HD VP2 or VP3 (G98). They also support Compute Capability 1.2, whereas older GeForce 8 and 9 GPUs only supported Compute Capability 1.1. All GT21x GPUs also contain an audio processor inside and support 8 channel LPCM output through HDMI.

Chipset table

GeForce 200 Series

All models support Coverage Sample Anti-Aliasing, Angle-Independent Anisotropic Filtering, 240-bit OpenEXR HDR.
 1 Unified Shaders : Texture mapping units : Render output units

Features
Compute Capability: 1.1 (G92 [GTS250] GPU)
Compute Capability: 1.2 (GT215, GT216, GT218 GPUs)
Compute Capability: 1.3 has double precision support for use in GPGPU applications. (GT200a/b GPUs only)

GeForce 200M (2xxM) Series
The GeForce 200M Series is a graphics processor architecture for notebooks.
1 Unified Shaders : Texture mapping units : Render output units

Discontinued support 

NVIDIA has ceased driver support for GeForce 200 series on April 1, 2016.

 Windows XP 32-bit & Media Center Edition: version 340.52 released on July 29, 2014; Download
 Windows XP 64-bit: version 340.52 released on July 29, 2014; Download
 Windows Vista, 7, 8, 8.1 32-bit: version 342.01 (WHQL) released on December 14, 2016; Download
 Windows Vista, 7, 8, 8.1 64-bit: version 342.01 (WHQL) released on December 14, 2016; Download
 Windows 10, 32-bit: version 342.01 (WHQL) released on December 14, 2016; Download
 Windows 10, 64-bit: version 342.01 (WHQL) released on December 14, 2016; Download
 Linux, 64-bit: version 340.108 released on December 23, 2019; Download

See also
 GeForce 8 series
 GeForce 9 series
 GeForce 100 series
 GeForce 300 series
 GeForce 400 series
 GeForce 500 series
 GeForce 600 series
 GeForce 700 series
 GeForce 800M series
 GeForce 900 series
 GeForce 10 series
 Nvidia Quadro
 Nvidia Tesla
 List of Nvidia graphics processing units

References

External links

 GeForce GTX 295
 GeForce GTX 285
 GeForce GTX 280
 GeForce GTX 275
 GeForce GTX 260
 GeForce GTS 250
 GeForce GTS 240 (OEM)
 GeForce GT 240
 GeForce GT 220
 GeForce 210
 GeForce 205
 Geforce gtx 295
 GeForce GTX 285M
 GeForce GTX 280M
 GeForce GTX 260M
 GeForce GTS 260M
 GeForce GTS 250M
 GeForce GT 240M
 GeForce GT 230M
 GeForce G210M
 Nvidia Nsight

200 series
Graphics cards
Computer-related introductions in 2008